Pontiac Moon is a 1994 adventure film directed by Peter Medak, and produced by Robert Schaffel and Youssef Vahabzadeh.

The film stars Ted Danson as Washington Bellamy, a "pigheaded" science teacher in a small town of California, as well as Mary Steenburgen as his wife Katherine. Danson was also one of three executive producers of the film, along with Jeffrey D. Brown (co-writer) and Robert Benedetti.

Plot
The film takes place in the summer of 1969, when NASA astronauts successfully landed on the Moon for the first time, in the Apollo 11 spacecraft. Katherine, suffering from panic attacks caused by an automobile accident which resulted in the loss of their unborn child, refuses to leave the house, while Washington is a man of adventure who enjoys travel and experiencing life. As a result of the conflict between the two, eleven-year-old son Andy (Ryan Todd) has never traveled in a car, nor has he ever left town.

Washington, who also maintains a ragtag collection of automobiles of various vintages, decides to travel with Andy to the Spires of the Moon National Park (a fictitious park possibly based on Craters of the Moon National Monument and Preserve), arriving at the very moment that the Apollo 11 crew lands on the Moon. They make the trip in Washington's 1949 Pontiac Eight Chieftain DeLuxe convertible (the grille indicates it's a 1950) nicknamed "Old Chief", and make some enemies, new friends, and learn the meaning of family. The Pontiac's mileage, when arriving at its destination, will be exactly the distance in miles from the Earth to the Moon.

When Katherine finds out where her husband and son are going, she faces her fears (she hasn't been out the house for seven years), and follows them in one of Washington's cars, an Amphicar. She learns the importance of living as she follows the Pontiac to Spires of the Moon. On the way, the Pontiac's engine dies, and Washington arranges for a mechanic to install a replacement engine, only to leave the premises without paying for the engine because he didn't have enough money to pay. At the moment of the Apollo 11 landing, the Pontiac crashes into a crater at Spires of the Moon, with Andy at the wheel. Katherine arrives, and they escape a police chase by driving the Amphicar into a lake to Canada and safety.

The adventure brings the Bellamy family together, and they are now ready to begin a more normal life.

Production
Parts of the film were shot in Cisco, Crescent Junction, Ruby Ranch Road, and Arches National Park in Utah.

Year-end lists 
 4th worst – Bob Strauss, Los Angeles Daily News

References

External links
 NYT Review
 
 
 

1994 films
1990s adventure films
American adventure films
Films directed by Peter Medak
Films set in 1969
Paramount Pictures films
Films scored by Randy Edelman
Films shot in Utah
1990s English-language films
1990s American films